Ying Wa Girls' School is an HKCCCC secondary day school for girls in Mid-Levels, Hong Kong. The campus is located at 76 Robinson Road, Mid-levels. Total enrollment currently stands at slightly under 1,000. It is one of the 22 Grant Schools in Hong Kong. Ying Wa Girls' School is a selective secondary school and its graduates are known for their distinguished performances at public examinations. The current Principal of the School is Mr. Francis Kwan.  He succeeded Mrs. Ruth Lee as the Principal in 2015.

The present campus comprises two sites: The Robinson Road Campus (Site A) stretching from Robinson Road all the way down to near Bonham Road, and the newly-acquired Breezy Path Campus (Site B).

History 
Ying Wa Girls' School was founded in February 1900 by Helen Davies of the former London Missionary Society.  This Society was founded in 1795. The School started as a boarding school for girls and expanded to include a secondary school section in 1915 and a two-year kindergarten in 1916. The School was referred to in English as ‘Training Home’. It was not until 1920 that the name of Ying Wa Girls’ school was officially adopted. The School started as a privately run school with a boarding section for primary pupils. However, it ceased taking on boarders in 1940.
In 1968, the primary school section closed and the School became a purely secondary school. In 1966, London Missionary Society was restructured to become the Council for World Mission and Ying Wa Girls' School became one of the affiliated schools of the Hong Kong Council of the Church of Christ in China.

Ying Wa Girls' School was one of the first girls' schools in Hong Kong that proposed the establishment of the student union. Students were elected to represent their peers and worked to promote self-expression.  

As a missionary of the London Missionary Society, Miss Vera Silcocks (1902-1977) came by boat from England to Hong Kong in 1927 to teach in the School. She spoke fluent Cantonese. In 1939, she became the Headmistress of the School. In December 1941, Hong Kong fell upon the Japanese invasion in the Battle of Hong Kong.  This Battle was a part of World War II.  During the subsequent Japanese occupation of Hong Kong, Miss Silcocks was held by the Japanese in the Stanley Internment Camp.  

After the War, in 1945, the School reopened. In 1947, Miss Silcocks returned to the School as Headmistress. In 1948, the School Council was established. In 1949, the Student Association was established. In 1967, Miss Silcocks retired and returned to England.

Redevelopment of campus

Since its establishment in 1900 by the London Missionary Society, Ying Wa Girls' School has been serving at its present site, providing education with a Christian character to young girls (and boys for a brief period) of Hong Kong of all classes. In December 2009, Ying Wa announced its redevelopment project. Supported by the Education Bureau, a new campus will replace the existing one on the same Robinson Road-Bonham Road site which has housed the school for over a century. On completion, available ground area will be expanded by about 50%, thus making it possible to overcome the recurring and constant lack of space since the founding. New spacious facilities and advanced installations will help Ying Wa take on the increasing demands of a fast-changing and diversified secondary curriculum.

In November 2011, Ying Wa Girls' School received HK $10 million from the Li Ka Shing Foundation. It was used to establish the Li Chong Yuet Ming Student Development Fund to provide opportunities for students to become global citizens through international exchanges and strengthen their commitment to the local community through social service, in line with the school motto "To serve and not to be served." The fund was named after Madam Amy Li Chong Yuet-ming, wife of Li Ka Shing, who attended the school.

After a long journey, Ying Wa has eventually embarked on a new page of its history in mid-March 2019 with the “Big Move” from the decanting site of Sham Shui Po back to Robinson Road.

Relationship with Ying Wa College
Ying Wa College is a school for boys founded also by the London Missionary Society. The Principal of Ying Wa College, Mr. Allan Cheng, is a member of the Incorporated Management Committee of Ying Wa Girls' School, while Mr. Francis Kwan is also a member of the Committee of Ying Wa College.

School Motto
Time is precious, treasure every minute.

Uniform
The school's uniform is a blue cheongsam, with silver school and house badges right under the hook of the collar.

The school uniform of Ying Wa has a unique design.  It is hemmed with wide dark blue lines along the bottom hem, sleeve and collar; and the stiff collar, a bit higher than those of other schools, is tailored to allow little slack between the collar and the neck.  Students complain about the strangling feeling, especially when they look downward to read or write at the desk, yet the school has a strict rule about keeping the collar properly hooked closed at all times, even during the hottest summers. The tightly fit collar permits poor ventilation, keeping perspiration inside the uniform, which becomes soggy when the weather is humid.  New students have to get used to the uniform when they first attend the school. However, once they learn to endure these hardships, the uniform turns to the most significant icon of their blissful life in Ying Wa, and a source of pride for its graduates.

Class structure and curriculum
There are altogether 30 classes in the school.
Form 1: 5 classes (A,B,C,D,E)
Form 2: 5 classes
Form 3: 5 classes
Form 4: 5 classes (NSS Curriculum)
Form 5: 5 classes (NSS Curriculum)
Form 6: 5 classes (NSS Curriculum)

Secondary One to Three offer a broad general curriculum with a good balance among languages, arts, science, cultural and practical subjects as well as religious education and physical education.

In Secondary Four to Six (NSS curriculum), students can choose 3 electives from a range of 15 subjects besides the 4 core subjects: Chinese, English, Mathematics and Liberal Studies.

Students will take the Hong Kong Diploma of Secondary Education Examination at the end of Secondary Six for admission to tertiary institutes through the Joint University Programmes Admission System (JUPAS).

As an E.M.I. (English as the Medium of Instruction) school, Ying Wa adopts English as the teaching medium in most subjects with the aim of achieving biliteracy (Chinese and English) and trilingualism with the inclusion of Putonghua.

All subjects, except Chinese Language, Chinese Language and Culture, Chinese Literature, Chinese History, Religious Education, Physical Education and Putonghua, are taught in English.

Lessons are arranged on a 5-day week basis. Toastmaster Leadership Training Programmes, Oral English Classes, Public Speaking Classes and Instrument Classes are offered after school and on Saturdays.

Student Association

Established by former principal, Miss Silcocks, in 1949, the Student Association is one of the oldest student bodies among local schools.

For years the Student Association has nurtured generations of student leaders and promoted self-government. The association aims at fostering students’ sense of belonging to the school by organising a wide variety of extracurricular activities. 

At present, the well-established association is composed of a nine-member Executive Committee and five sub-committees, namely the Press Committee, the Programme Committee, the Promotion Committee, the Sports Committee and the Welfare Committee. All committee members are elected by schoolmates in late September every year.

Executive committee

Press Committee

The school newsletter, Clarion, is published by the Press Committee three times a year. It gives students a platform to exchange ideas, share their experiences and feel connected to each other. The newsletter covers a range of topics, from stories of personal growth to insights on current and regional or global news. The paper encourages students to think critically and form opinions after thorough research.

In recent years, the committee started a feature on interviews with the teachers and the administrative staff. The publication bridges the gap between the faculty and its students.

Sports Committee

The Sports Committee aims at promoting sports and stirring students’ interests in sports. The Committee organises inter-class competitions, the Graduation Cup and various sports competitions. The Sports Committee and Inter-house Committee also co-organise the annual Athletics Meet and Swimming Gala. Students are strongly encouraged to engage in sports and lead active lives.

Promotion Committee

The Promotion Committee provides publicity to activities organised by the Student Association. At Thanksgiving Week and Christmas, decorations and ornaments can be seen virtually at every corner on campus to bring the festivities to the campus.

Programme Committee

The Programme Committee coordinates a variety of interest clubs and encourages students to participate in club activities. At the beginning of the school year, it helps with the recruitment of club members and officials. To facilitate their work, the committee offers workshops to train club officials and supervises their activities. At the end of the year, ECA records of students are collated and feedback is given to clubs to assist them with their future  plans.

Welfare Committee

The Welfare Committee aims to provide welfare benefits to students at the school. Book sales are arranged regularly to provide students with stationery, such as exercise books and writing paper. PE uniform sales are held before the Athletics Meet and the Swimming Gala.
Moreover, the Welfare Committee negotiates discounts with shops and businesses near the school. Credit must be given to the hard work of the committee as students can now enjoy preferential rates at various restaurants and buy bargain items at the annual stationery sale.

House system
There are five Houses, named after the five early principals of the school:
Davies (green)
Hogben (yellow)
Hutchinson (blue)
Silcocks (orange)
Jenkins (red)

Each house is represented by two house captains. The houses compete with each other on sports day and at the swimming gala. The aim of establishing the house system is to strengthen the students' ties to the school.

See also
The Hong Kong Council of the Church of Christ in China
List of secondary schools in Hong Kong
London Missionary Society
Ying Wa College

References

External links
Official Website
Ying Wa Girls' School Alumnae Association Website

Mid-Levels
Educational institutions established in 1900
Girls' schools in Hong Kong
Hong Kong Council of the Church of Christ in China
Secondary schools in Hong Kong
Protestant secondary schools in Hong Kong
1900 establishments in Hong Kong